The Omosa River is a river in Madang Province, Papua New Guinea.

The Omosan languages are spoken in the area.

See also
List of rivers of Papua New Guinea
Omosa River languages

References

Rivers of Papua New Guinea